was a town located in Higashiuwa District, Ehime Prefecture, Japan.

As of 2003, the town had an estimated population of 17,692 and a density of 133.49 persons per km². The total area was 132.53 km².

On April 1, 2004, Uwa was merged with the towns of Akehama, Nomura and Shirokawa (all from Higashiuwa District), and the town of Mikame (from Nishiuwa District), to create the city of Seiyo.

Climate

See also 
 Kaimei School

References

External links
Official website of Seiyo 

Dissolved municipalities of Ehime Prefecture
Seiyo, Ehime